Ken Pontac is an American writer, who has written for ToddWorld, LazyTown and Happy Tree Friends and helped create its spin-off Ka-Pow!. Pontac also was a co-creator of Bump in the Night.

Writing credits

Television credits
Gumby Adventures (1988)
Mighty Max (1993)
Bump in the Night (1994-1995)
 Extreme Dinosaurs (1997)
 The Legend of Calamity Jane (1997)
 Shadow Raiders (1998-1999) 
 ReBoot (1999)
 Roswell Conspiracies: Aliens, Myths and Legends (1999)
 Sherlock Holmes in the 22nd Century (1999, 2001)
 Howdi Gaudi (2002)
 LazyTown (2004)
 ¡Mucha Lucha! (2004)
 ToddWorld (2004)
 Happy Tree Friends (2004-2008)
 Krypto the Superdog (2005)
 Pet Alien (2005)
 Growing Up Creepie (2006)
 The Secret Show (2006)
 Iron Man: Armored Adventures (2008) 
 Storm Hawks (2008)
 Arthur (2010-2013)
 Generator Rex (2011)  
 Matt Hatter Chronicles (2011-2012)
 Transformers: Rescue Bots (2012)
 The Octonauts (2012, 2014)
 Slugterra (2012-2015, 2017)
 Pac-Man and the Ghostly Adventures (2013-2015)
 Thunderbirds Are Go (2015)
 Luna Petunia (2017)
 Kong: King of the Apes (2018)
 Woody Woodpecker (2020, 2022)
 Curious George (2020)
 Mighty Express (2021)

Video game credits
 ClayFighter (1993)
 Primal Rage (1994)
 ClayFighter 63⅓ (1997) 
 ClayFighter: Sculptor's Cut (1998)
 MadWorld (2009)
 Sonic Colors (2010)
 Sonic Generations (2011)
 Sonic Lost World (2013)
 Sonic Boom: Shattered Crystal (2014)
 Sonic Boom: Fire & Ice (2016)
 Sonic Forces (2017)
 State of Decay 2 (2018)
 Team Sonic Racing (2019)

Comic books
 Justice League Unlimited #44 (2008)
Wacky Raceland #1-4 (2016)

External links
 

Living people
American male writers
Year of birth missing (living people)